Megalovalvata baicalensis is a species of freshwater snail with an operculum, an aquatic gastropod mollusk in the family Valvatidae, the valve snails.

Distribution
This species occurs in lake Baikal in depths from 3 to 50 m, and in the Angara River in Russia.

The type locality is Lake Baikal ("Baikalsee").

Habitat
This snail lives in freshwater habitats.

References

External links 
 

Valvatidae
Gastropods described in 1859
Fauna of Lake Baikal